Dillwynia sieberi, commonly known as Sieber's parrot-pea, is a species of flowering plant in the family Fabaceae and is endemic to eastern Australia. It is an erect shrub with rigid, needle-shaped, sharply-pointed leaves and yellow to yellow-orange flowers with reddish-brown markings.

Description

Taxonomy and naming
Dillwynia sieberi was first formally described in 1840 by Ernst Gottlieb von Steudel in his book Nomenclator Botanicus. The specific epithet (sieberi) honours Franz Sieber.

Distribution
Sieber's parrot-pea grows in forest and woodland and is widespread along the ranges and western slopes of New South Wales and the Australian Capital Territory, and in coastal areas between Newcastle and Nowra. It also occurs in south-eastern Queensland and a few places in south-eastern Victoria.

References 

sieberi
Fabales of Australia
Flora of New South Wales
Flora of the Australian Capital Territory
Flora of Queensland
Flora of Victoria (Australia)
Taxa named by Ernst Gottlieb von Steudel
Plants described in 1840